Anthopteropsis is a genus of flowering plants belonging to the family Ericaceae.

Its native range is Central America.

Species:

Anthopteropsis insignis

References

Ericaceae
Ericaceae genera